A placard is a notice installed in a public place, like a small card, sign, or plaque. It can be attached to or hung from a vehicle or building to indicate information about the vehicle operator or contents of a vehicle or building. It can also refer to paperboard signs or notice carried by picketers or demonstrators.

Buildings 
A placard is posted on buildings to communicate a wide variety of information, such as fire safety policies, emergency shelters.

The International Building Code requires doors in some public and commercial structures, fitted with an internal key lock have a notice "This door to remain unlocked when this space is occupied" in a minimum of  text be posted beside or above the door. Some state and local building codes modify this text, such as California fire code, which specifies "This door to remain unlocked during business hours".

Temporary placards may be placed on buildings such as warning signs when a structure is being fumigated, or has been condemned by building inspectors or the fire department and is unsafe to enter.

Fallout shelters

As part of the civil defense preparations in the event of a nuclear attack, in 1961 United States began establishing fallout shelters in communities across the country. The shelters were symbolized by orange-yellow and black trefoil symbol, designed by Robert W. Blakeley.

In 1962, 1.4 million metal signs and 1 million adhesive stickers were manufactured and distributed across the country at a total cost of $700,500 .
Two standard signs were used widely, a  aluminum sign for posting on the exterior of buildings identifying the building as having a fallout shelter, and a  steel sign, intended for interior use to the shelter's location and mark the actual location of the shelter within the building.

The sign system included 'overlays' that were designed to be added to signs for conveying additional information about the specific shelter and its location.
Exterior sign overlays:

 Numbers - for Capacity marking
 Arrows
 In Basement
 Refugio - (Spanish speaking areas)
 Refugio Contra Radiacion - (Spanish speaking areas)
 Lafiga Mai Pefuatomika - (American Samoa)
 Aofai E Ofi - (American Samoa)
 Miles
 Blocks
 Numbers for "Miles" & "Blocks"

Interior sign overlays:

 Starts Here - With arrows
 Capacity - with numbers
 Comienzo - with arrows (Spanish speaking areas)
 Amata Iinei - with arrows (American Samoa)
 In This Corridor
 On
 Floors
 Numbers for the "Floors"

Alternate languages overlays in Spanish in areas where it was widely spoken and Samoan for use on American Samoa.

Following the ending of funding for fallout shelters in the late 1970s. Following the end of the program there was no organized effort by the federal government reclaim shelter supplies and signage, resulting in most shelters being abandoned in situ until building owners cleared away the shelter's supplies and signage during subsequent renovations or demolition projects.  In 2017, New York City announced a formal project to go through all city-owned structures and remove any remaining fallout shelter signage, citing the fact no structure still had a functioning shelter and would not be usable in an emergency.

Firefighting markings
Numerous markings have been developed to better aid firefighters and other first responders to warn of hazards from hazardous materials, location of utility shut-offs, fire alarm and sprinkler control panels, construction and condition of the building.

Fire sprinkler systems
The International Code Council's International Building Code requires that all fire standpipe and fire sprinkler connections must be visible from the roadway or fire department access in new construction. Signs must also state what is fed by the connection. If a connection does not cover an entire building, such a connection feeding fire sprinklers that are only in a new addition, the area covered must be stated on the sign.

If a fire alarm system does not automatically call the fire department, a "When Alarm Sounds - Call Fire Department" sign must be posted at all fire alarm pull station/call points and at any external fire alarm notification appliances.

NFPA 704

NFPA 704 is a standard developed by the National Fire Protection Association for warning first responders to hazards posed by hazardous materials stored in a building or facility. The signs are intended to be mounted on the exteriors of buildings, storage tanks and storage areas.

The square is divided into four sections, color coded: Red - flammability; blue - health hazard; yellow - reactivity/instability; White - special hazard, such as oxidizers, water reactive or Asphyxiating gas.

The red, yellow and blue sections are labeled on scale of 0 to 4; 0 'minimal hazard' to 4, 'severe hazard'. White (special hazard) is represented by letter codes ("OX","SA", a "W" with a line through it).

NFPA 170
Introduced in 1991, NFPA 710 combined 4 existing standards, 171, 172, 174 and 178 into a single standard NFPA 710 - Fire Safety and Emergency Symbols. The standard contains symbols for use in buildings to locate exits, firefighting equipment and enforce fire safety rules, in addition to symbols for building blueprints, diagrams and firefighting operation maps.

The standard utilizes the ISO's 'running man' symbol for exit signage, similar to international standards, along with the ISO 7010 symbols for Fire alarm call point, fire extinguisher and fire hose reel.
The standard also provides symbols for marking standpipe connectors and identifying what the standpipe connection supplies water to: fire sprinkler systems, standpipes or both.

The standard also contains symbols for informing for enforcing fire safety rules, such as prohibiting cooking, smoking, hanging of items from fire sprinklers, and use of elevators in evacuations.

Truss/floor construction
Changes in building design, towards 'lightweight construction' in the late 20th century has presented new hazards to firefighters. The materials are prone to failure when exposed to flames, resulting in roof and floor collapses, spread of fire due to heat conduction in designs using metal. The placard's design varies from state to state, though numerous designs use triangles. All systems use the basic labeling system: "F" for 'floor', "R" for 'roof' and "RF" for 'floor and roof'. New York's system also includes information on the material trusses are constructed from.
The states of Florida, New Jersey, New York, Vermont, and Mississippi; along with the cities of San Francisco, CA, Chesapeake, VA and Acushnet, MA have laws requiring posting of a truss warning placard on structures.

Vacant Building markings
On 3 December 1999, six firefighters died fighting a fire inside an abandoned six floor warehouse. The firefighters had entered the structure and became disoriented and unable to escape the maze-like interior before multiple collapses occurred. Following the disaster, the National Institute for Occupational Safety and Health recommended: 

In 2006, the International Code Council's International Fire Code introduced a marking system to help firefighters identify abandoned, vacant or unsafe structures and hazards posed by them. The system was devised from system used by the New York City Fire Department, recommended by NIOSH in the Worcester report, with modifications to color and sign dimensions. The signs are red and white,  square, mounted on the front and entrances to the structure, with the date it was posted.

To provide useful information in planning operations, signs can have letter combinations added to identify known hazards.

 R/O - Roof open
 S/M - Stairs, steps and landings missing
 F/E - Avoid fire escapes
 H/F - Holes in floor
 F/O - Floors open

Vehicles

Abnormal transportation

Vehicles involved in Oversize load transport display markings warning other road users that the vehicle's load may exceed the marked lane's width, unusually long, or tall. The transport vehicle may be forced to travel at unusually low speeds, make unusual maneuvers to avoid overhead hazards or complete turns.

Dangerous goods markings

ADR Treaty

Road vehicles carrying dangerous goods in countries that follow the European Agreement concerning the International Carriage of Dangerous Goods by Road (ADR), are required to display an orange plate on the front and rear of the vehicle. 
ADR marking display requirements:
Vans, box trucks and curtain side trucks: blank orange plate, front and rear of vehicle.
Road vehicles carrying shipping containers: Blank orange plate, front and rear of vehicle and appropriate hazard placard on all sides of the container.
Tanker trucks, tank containers:Blank orange plate, front of vehicle; ADR Plate with HIN and UN number and hazard placard on both sides and rear of tank.

United States Department of Transportation

In the United States, Hazardous goods are broken into two categories, Table 1 and Table 2. Materials on Table 1 must be placarded in any quantity.

Materials on Table 2, which is all other hazardous materials not in Table 1, must display placard if  or more of the material is loaded into a vehicle. If   or less of a Table 2 material is loaded onto the vehicle, the placard is optional.

Placards are required on all four sides of any motor vehicles, rail cars, and shipping containers loaded with hazardous materials. It must be attached upright, securely, kept in good condition, not obstructed by ladders, pipes or tarpaulins. It must be located at least  from other markings that could reduce its effectiveness.

The law also prohibits the display of placards on vehicles that are not loaded with the hazardous material listed on the placard, placards that do not meet design guidelines in § 172.519 General specifications for placards, or displaying advertising and slogans in a design or manner that could be confused for a placard.

Other uses 
In Model United Nations, the paper nameplate of a delegation is referred to as a "placard".

In computer graphical user interfaces, a placard is a rectangular area of a window meant for displaying information to the user.

In the Habsburg Netherlands (1482–1794) and the Dutch Republic (1581–1795) laws were often known as "Placards" after their form of publication by way of a placard that was nailed to a wall in a public place. An important example is the Dutch declaration of independence of 1581, known in Dutch as Plakkaat van Verlatinghe.

See also
 Affair of the Placards (French: Affaire des Placards), 17 October 1534 anti-Catholic incident where posters appeared in public places in five major French cities which brought an end to the conciliatory policies of King Francis I.
 Election placard (lawn sign)
 Sign war
 Poster

Notes

References

External links

Commons

Other links
 
 US DOT Hazardous Materials Placarding Requirements

Infographics
Signage